Moussa Cissé (born 10 September 2002) is a Guinean college basketball player for the Oklahoma State Cowboys of the Big 12 Conference. He previously played for the Memphis Tigers. He was a consensus five-star recruit and one of the best centers in the 2020 class.

Early life and high school career
Cissé was born in Conakry, Guinea, and lived there until age 14, when he moved to New York. He had grown up playing soccer. Cissé started playing high school basketball for St. Benedict's Preparatory School in Newark, New Jersey, playing alongside Precious Achiuwa. For two years, he played for Christ the King Regional High School in Queens, where he was teammates with Kofi Cockburn. As a sophomore, Cissé led his team to the Class AA state title game. 

For his junior season, he transferred to Lausanne Collegiate School in Memphis, Tennessee. On 25 November 2019, Cissé recorded 31 points, 22 rebounds and 21 blocks, surpassing the Shelby County single-game blocks record held by Mitch Omar since 1976–77. He led Lausanne to the Division II-A state championship, where he was named most valuable player after posting 15 points, 10 rebounds and nine blocks against First Assembly Christian School. As a junior, Cissé averaged 18.4 points, 15.3 rebounds and 9.2 blocks per game, earning Division II-A Tennessee Mr. Basketball honors. He broke Michael Wilson's single-season city record for blocks per game set in 1989–90.

Recruiting
Cissé was a consensus five-star recruit, according to major recruiting services, and was considered a top 10 player in the 2021 recruiting class. On 27 May 2020, he announced that he would graduate from high school a year early and reclassify to the 2020 class, where he remained a five-star recruit. On 15 July, Cissé committed to play college basketball for Memphis. He was drawn to the program by head coach Penny Hardaway and former high school teammate Precious Achiuwa, who had played for Memphis in the previous season.

College career
On December 2, 2020, Cissé posted his first double-double with 14 points and 10 rebounds in an 83–54 win against Arkansas State. He averaged 6.6 points, 6.3 rebounds and 1.6 blocks per game as a freshman, earning American Athletic Conference Freshman of the Year honors. On April 6, 2021, he declared for the 2021 NBA draft while maintaining his college eligibility. He later withdrew from the draft and entered the transfer portal. On July 15, 2021, Cissé transferred to Oklahoma State, choosing the Cowboys over Florida State, Georgia and Kentucky. He was named Big 12 Co-Defensive Player of the Year as a sophomore, alongside Baylor’s Jonathan Tchamwa Tchatchoua and West Virginia’s Gabe Osabuohien. Cissé averaged 7.2 points, 6.5 rebounds and 1.9 blocks per game. He was named to the Big 12 All-Defensive Team as a junior.

Career statistics

College

|-
| style="text-align:left;"| 2020–21
| style="text-align:left;"| Memphis
| 28 || 28 || 18.6 || .552 || .000 || .324 || 6.3 || .5 || .3 || 1.6 || 6.6
|-
| style="text-align:left;"| 2021–22
| style="text-align:left;"| Oklahoma State
| 29 || 26 || 20.0 || .559 || – || .562 || 6.5 || .3 || .4 || 1.3 || 7.2
|- class="sortbottom"
| style="text-align:center;" colspan="2"| Career
| 57 || 54 || 19.3 || .556 || .000 || .454 || 6.4 || .4 || .4 || 1.8 || 6.9

References

External links
Oklahoma State Cowboys bio
Memphis Tigers bio

2002 births
Living people
Centers (basketball)
Guinean expatriate basketball people in the United States
Guinean men's basketball players
Memphis Tigers men's basketball players
Sportspeople from Conakry
St. Benedict's Preparatory School alumni